Fort Cusseta  was a wooden stockade built by white settlers to protect against feared Creek Indian attacks. Its ruins still exist today within the small community of Cusseta, Alabama. 

Following the signing of the Treaty of Cusseta, local settlers built a 16 feet by 30 feet hand-hewn log fort for protection from a possible uprising from the Creek village of Cusseta. Walls were four and six feet high with portholes at a height of four feet. The fort never saw any military action. Following the removal of the Indians, the fort was incorporated into a building that had various uses over the years, including that of a country store. Today the structure is vacant with its surviving heart-pine walls exposed and beginning to deteriorate.

The fort is one of the few surviving examples of a log fort in Alabama. A historical marker has been placed at the fort site.

References

External links
 Historical Marker Database - Fort Cusseta
 Picture from the Alabama Department of Archives and History showing former buildings on the site

Buildings and structures in Chambers County, Alabama
Native American history of Alabama
Ruins in the United States
Populated places established in 1832
1832 establishments in Alabama
Cusseta